Harskirchen is a commune in the Bas-Rhin department and Grand Est region of north-eastern France.

Location
Harskirchen lies in the valley of the River Saar in the extreme northwest of the cultural and historical region of Alsace. The Canal des houillères de la Sarre, which connects the Canal de la Marne au Rhin in Gondrexange to the canalized Sarre in Sarreguemines, passes through the commune, west of the village centre.

Churches
Like many communities in French Alsace and the German upper Rhineland, Harskirhen has both a Lutheran and a Catholic church. The Lutheran church dates from the eighteenth century and is decorated in the Baroque style, while the nineteenth-century Catholic church is distinguished by its neo-Gothic tower.

Population

See also
 Communes of the Bas-Rhin department

References

Communes of Bas-Rhin
Bas-Rhin communes articles needing translation from French Wikipedia